Crazy is a 2000 German drama film directed by Hans-Christian Schmid. It is based on the autobiographical book by Benjamin Lebert, published in 1999. The film is a drama about a 16-year-old boy named Benjamin who, after experiencing some academic problems, is switched to a boarding school in an attempt to improve his grades. When he reaches the new school, he has difficulty acclimating to his new environment along with some coming of age issues, when he falls in love with a dreamy school girl named Malen. The part of Benjamin was played by Robert Stadlober.

Cast 
 Robert Stadlober - Benjamin Lebert
 Tom Schilling - Janosch Schwarze
  - Malen
 Julia Hummer - Marie
  - Troy
 Christoph Ortmann - Kugli
  - Dünner Felix
 Willy Rachow - Florian
 Dagmar Manzel - Juliane Lebert, Benjamin's mother
 Burghart Klaußner - Klaus Lebert, Benjamin's father
  - Paula Lebert, Benjamin's sister
  - Herr Falkenstein
 Katharina Müller-Elmau - Frau Westphalen

References

External links 

2000 films
German coming-of-age films
Crazy (film)
Films directed by Hans-Christian Schmid
Films based on biographies
Films set in boarding schools
2000s coming-of-age films
2000s German films